Morarka Organic Foods is a Private Sector Organisation that offers services in Food Processing/ Beverages.

History
Born in a traditional Marwari family, Kamal Morarka, an industrialist, former cabinet minister and philanthropist registered M.R.Morarka-GDC Rural Research Foundation in 1993 in memory of his father Late M.R.Morarka funded by M/s.Gannon Dunkerley & Company Ltd.

Organic
The foundation is focused on carrying out research by involving grass root beneficiaries for sustainable agriculture development. Morarka Foundation  has ventured into areas such as Organic Farming and Certifications, Agriculture Extension, Tourism Promotion, Waste Management, Vermi Compost, Conservation of Heritage etc.

The Foundation employs more than 400 full-time workers including over 40 professionally qualified post graduates, over 70 graduates and large number of well trained extension workers in Agriculture Biotechnology and Organic agriculture and provides Vermiculture know-how to over 300 Agripreneurs every year in India. It produces over 50,000 M.T. (1 M.T. = 1000 kg.) of Vermicasting every month and has over 1 Lac hectare land under Certified Organic Cultivation. It has involved nearly 70,000 farmers to join its organic agriculture activities in Jaipur, Jhalawar, Pali, Sirohi, Barmer and Jhunjhunu districts.

Morarka Foundation has joined hands with an operations consulting firm Global Management Services to set up a joint venture company to convert large tracts of agricultural land in Assam as certified organic land to drive the eco-investments in the North East region.

Farm2Kitchen Morarka Good Food – Retail Outlets

Morarka Organic has joined hands with Farm2Kitchen Foods Pvt Ltd to launch Good Food Stores offering all organic and natural foods and grocery across India. 

With this initiative Morarka will be connecting millions of Indian households directly with Organic and Natural farmers across the country.

Farm2Kitchen Morarka Good Food Store will be launched in Bangalore, Hyderabad, New Delhi, Gurgaon, Chennai, Chandigarh, Ahmedabad, Surat, Gandhinagar, Ranchi, Kochi, Pune, Mumbai, Nagpur and various other cities across India.

Morarka Organic distributes its products in the retail segment under the brand name of Down to Earth. Morarka Organic has launched an online shopping website " http://www.downtoearthorganicfood.com " to make its products available to consumers across India and world at the click of a mouse. The company offers a range of food products including cereals, pulses, spices, condiments, masala mixes, oils, ready-to-eat snacks, various kinds of cookies, etc., along with English herbs. The products undergo a strict quality standard check and are certified by several certifications including OneCert Asia Agri Certification as per NOP (USDA), NPOP (Government of India) and EU Standards for Organic Certification.

Morarka organic products are available at the Down to Earth store in Tardeo in Mumbai, Chattarpur in New Delhi, at Burdwan road in Kolkata, Vastrapur in Ahmedabad, Vatika road at Jaipur, Luxmi mandir j.k fatak, Jaipur and Indiranagar at Bangalore. These flagship stores are the first of their kind in India, completely dedicated to organic food and fabric. Down to Earth products are also available at major supermarkets, modern trade outlets and stand alone organic stores across the India.

Zoo
Morarka Organics has also started exporting organic foods to Canada, Chile, US, Middle Asia etc. The exports are mainly  conventional pulses for which there is a heavy demand in the U.S.

References

External links
 M.R.Morarka-GDC Rural Research Foundation

Food and drink companies of India